The Bureau of Corporations, predecessor to the Federal Trade Commission, was created as an investigatory agency within the Department of Commerce and Labor in the United States. The Bureau and the Department were created by Congress on February 14, 1903, during the Progressive Era.

The main role of the Bureau was to study and report on industry, looking especially for monopolistic practices. Its 1906 report on petroleum transportation made recommendations that became part of the Hepburn Act of 1906, and was used when the Justice Department successfully prosecuted and broke up Standard Oil in 1911.

In 1912 the Bureau issued a report on the development of water power in the United States, including its ownership or control, and fundamental economic principles involved in utilization of this new and rapidly growing energy source.  The report noted an increasing concentration of ownership and control of widely separated waterpower developments in the hands of a few; a substantial interrelationship among leading water-power interests, as well as a significant and increasing affiliation between water-power companies and street-railway and electric-lighting companies. The report stressed the importance of promptly adopting a definitive public policy concerning water-power development.  The various concerns expressed would initially be regulated by the Federal Water Power Act of 1920. The business, managerial, and financial practices of these early utility holding companies would proliferate, but remain largely unregulated until the Public Utility Holding Company Act of 1935.

The Bureau also conducted studies of tobacco, steel, lumber and other industries.

The Bureau became part of the new Federal Trade Commission in 1915.   The new Commission took over both staff and ongoing investigations from the Bureau. Commissioner of Corporations, Joseph E. Davies, became the FTC's first Chairman and Davies' deputy Francis Walker became the chief economist of the FTC

Further reading
  Fishbein, Meyer Harry. "Bureau of Corporations: An Agency of the Progressive Era"  American University ProQuest Dissertations Publishing,  1954. 28595050.

 MacLean, Elizabeth Kimball. "Joseph E. Davies: The Wisconsin Idea and the Origins of the Federal Trade Commission," Journal of the Gilded Age and Progressive Era (2007) 6#3 pp 248–284.
 Murphey, William, “Theodore Roosevelt and the Bureau of Corporation: Executive-Corporate Cooperation and the Advancement of the Regulatory State,” American Nineteenth Century History 14 (March 2013), 73–111.

References

1915 disestablishments in Washington, D.C.
Commerce and Labor
Commerce and Labor
Government agencies established in 1903
1903 establishments in Washington, D.C.